Chaqa Bahar (also Romanized as Chaqā Bahār and Choqā Bahār) is a village in Chaqa Narges Rural District, Mahidasht District, Kermanshah County, Kermanshah Province, Iran. At the 2006 census, its population was 175, in 43 families.

References 

Populated places in Kermanshah County